This is the results breakdown of the local elections held in Navarre on 13 June 1999. The following tables show detailed results in the autonomous community's most populous municipalities, sorted alphabetically.

Overall

City control
The following table lists party control in the most populous municipalities, including provincial capitals (shown in bold). Gains for a party are displayed with the cell's background shaded in that party's colour.

Municipalities

Barañain
Population: 20,182

Burlada
Population: 15,860

Estella
Population: 12,535

Pamplona
Population: 179,145

Tafalla
Population: 10,159

Tudela
Population: 27,188

See also
1999 Navarrese regional election

References

Navarre
1999